Joseph Daley may refer to:
Joseph Daley (jazz musician), American educator, jazz musician, composer and arranger
Joseph Thomas Daley (1915–1983), US prelate
Joseph Daley (musician), on the 1974 jazz album Crystals

See also
Joe Daley (disambiguation)